is a Japanese Olympian speed skater.

Education 
Go is studying commerce at the  Yamanashi Gakuin University in Kofu, Japan.

Career 
Go won a bronze medal in the 500m at the 2017 Asian Winter Games. She competed in the women's 1000 metres and the women's 500 metres at the 2018 Winter Olympics.

Go received the Shiny Matsuyama Grand Prize in Japan in 2017.

References

External links

1987 births
Living people
Japanese female speed skaters
Olympic speed skaters of Japan
Speed skaters at the 2018 Winter Olympics
Speed skaters at the 2022 Winter Olympics
Place of birth missing (living people)
Asian Games medalists in speed skating
Speed skaters at the 2017 Asian Winter Games
Asian Games bronze medalists for Japan
Medalists at the 2017 Asian Winter Games
20th-century Japanese women
21st-century Japanese women